Enda Barrett (born 2 February 1987) is an Irish hurler who currently plays as a left wing-forward for the Clare senior team.

Barrett made his first appearance for the team during the 2009 National League, however, he failed to make an immediate impact on the team. Since then however, he has won one National League (Division 1B) medal.

At club level Barrett is a one-time county club championship medalist with Newmarket-on-Fergus.

Barrett played for NUI Galway in the Fitzgibbon Cup, and was part of the team that lost the 2007 final.

References

1987 births
Living people
Clare inter-county hurlers
Newmarket-on-Fergus hurlers
University of Galway hurlers